Santiago Creel Miranda (born on 11 December 1954) is a Mexican lawyer and politician, who's a member of the National Action Party. Since September 1, 2021, he is a federal deputy and the current President of the Congress of the Union and of the Board of Directors of the Chamber of Deputies. He served as Secretary of the Interior during the presidency of Vicente Fox Quesada, from 2000 to 2005. In 2006, he was elected Senator to the Congress of the Union and served as President of the Senate of the Republic from 2007 to 2008. In 2016 he served as Constituent Deputy of Mexico City.

Background and family life

His campaign describes his background as that of a lawyer, father, and husband, as well as of a Party loyalist.  Descendant of the Creel-Terrazas family, son of René Creel Luján, one of the founders of the National Action Party, Santiago Creel has extensive connections within the PAN.  In 2008 he admitted that he is the father of actress Edith González's daughter, Constanza.

Education

Creel received a bachelor's degree in Law from the National Autonomous University of Mexico (UNAM) and subsequently did graduate work at Georgetown University and earned a master's degree at the University of Michigan.

Political career

His career highlights include running for Head of Government of the Federal District in 2000 (a race he narrowly lost to Andrés Manuel López Obrador). He was later appointed to the cabinet by President Vicente Fox to serve as Secretary of the Interior, a position he held from December 2000 to June 2005.

On June 1, 2005, Creel presented Fox with his resignation in order to seek his party's candidacy for the 2006 presidential election. Creel's main contender for the PAN's candidacy was Felipe Calderón who won the primary elections and went on to become President of Mexico.

In 2006 Santiago Creel received a proportional representation seat in the Senate to serve during the 60th and 61st Legislatures (2006–2012) and led the PAN Senate delegation until June 2008.

2012 PAN presidential primary

Santiago Creel decided to run for the PAN's Presidential Nomination for the 2012 and initially led polls ahead of the other candidates on the basis of his strong name recognition.  He has been falling behind a rising Vazquez Mota in the later half of 2011 and also faces stiff competition from Ernesto Cordero.  He has identified himself as more independent from the current administration than either Josefina Vazquez Mota or Ernesto Cordero and he has demanded noninterference and a clean result, with confidence in a fair result not to be overturned, but his support not being a blank check, but rather assuming the absence of serious issues.

Constituent Assembly of Mexico City
Creel was one of seven PAN representatives elected by the voters of Mexico City to sit on the Constituent Assembly of Mexico City, which will convene on September 15, 2016.

References

External links

1954 births
Living people
People from Mexico City
Mexican people of American descent
Mexican people of Irish descent
National Action Party (Mexico) politicians
20th-century Mexican lawyers
Mexican Secretaries of the Interior
Members of the Senate of the Republic (Mexico)
Presidents of the Senate of the Republic (Mexico)
National Autonomous University of Mexico alumni
University of Michigan alumni
21st-century Mexican politicians